Volčanski Ruti is a dispersed settlement in the hills to the south of Volče in the Municipality of Tolmin in the Littoral region of Slovenia, close to the border with Italy.

The local church is dedicated to Saint Florian and belongs to the Parish of Volče.

References

External links
Volčanski Ruti on Geopedia

Populated places in the Municipality of Tolmin